Fissipedia is a former biological suborder comprising the largely land-based families of the order Carnivora.  By and large, members of this suborder are meat-eaters, with the giant panda and red panda (each exclusively herbivorous) being the most notable exceptions.

In some former taxonomic classifications, Pinnipedia is treated as an order in its           own right rather than as a suborder within the Carnivora. In these classifications, Fissipedia is the sole suborder of Carnivora, and is thus omitted on the grounds of redundancy.

Classification
 Order Carnivora
 Suborder Fissipedia (now defunct)
 Family Canidae: dogs and allies; 35 species in 10 genera
 Family Procyonidae: raccoons and allies; 19 species in 7 genera
 Family Ursidae: bears; 8 species in 5 genera
 Family Mustelidae weasels, ferrets, badgers, and otters; 55 species in 24 genera
 Family Mephitidae skunks; 10 species in 3 genera
 Family Felidae: cats; 37 species in 4 genera
 Family Viverridae: civets and allies; 35 species in 20 genera
 Family Herpestidae: mongooses and allies; 35 species in 17 genera
 Family Hyaenidae: hyenas and aardwolf; 4 species in 3 genera
 Suborder Pinnipedia (formerly a separate order, now used only informally)
 Family Odobenidae (walruses)
 Family Otariidae (fur seals and sea lions)
 Family Phocidae (true seals)

References

Carnivorans
Mammal suborders
Obsolete mammal taxa